Francis Willey, 1st Baron Barnby (27 February 1841 – 16 February 1929) was an English wool merchant.

Willey was born in Bradford and joined his father's wool business, which later became Francis Willey & Co Ltd and had agencies all over the Dominions and the United States. Willey was also a great horseman, huntsman and racehorse owner. He was created Baron Barnby in the 1922 New Year Honours.

Willey was commissioned Sub-Lieutenant in the 2nd West Riding of Yorkshire Artillery Volunteers in December 1874. He was promoted Major in May 1888 and resigned in April 1891.

His seat was Blyth Hall, Nottinghamshire. He was appointed High Sheriff of Nottinghamshire for 1908. He was succeeded in the barony by his only son, Vernon.

He bought Castle Menzies near Aberfeldy and 11,600 acres of estate in 1918 for £69,000 ). On his death, his widow put the estate up for sale in April 1930.

Footnotes

References
Obituary, The Times, 18 February 1929

1841 births
1929 deaths
Businesspeople from Bradford
Barons Barnby
Royal Artillery officers
High Sheriffs of Nottinghamshire
Barons created by George V